is a Japanese light novel series, written by Yuu Kamiya and Tsubaki Himana, and illustrated by Shino. Kodansha has published four volumes since April 2, 2013, under their Kodansha Ranobe Bunko imprint. The story is set in a clockpunk fantasy version of the world, in which the entire planet is run by clockwork. The main characters are five people (a machine otaku, two automata, a young technician and a bodyguard) who, after a month of meeting, become the world's most infamous terrorists.

A manga adaptation illustrated by Kuro was serialized in Kodansha's shōnen manga magazine Monthly Shōnen Sirius since 2013 and ended in August 2018. It has been collected in ten tankōbon volumes. An anime television series adaptation by Xebec aired from April 6 to June 22, 2017.

Plot
At an unspecified point in time, Earth collapses. Despite it being almost inevitable that humankind would die out, a genius engineer known only as "Y" manages to rebuild Earth entirely with gears and clockwork mechanisms, renaming it "Clockwork Planet". 1,000 years later, original cities of Earth's countries are flourishing inside the planet's surface gears. Naoto Miura, a high school student living in Grid: Kyoto who is in love with mechanics, is dragged into a world crisis when a mechanical crate crashes into his apartment. There, he meets RyuZU, a broken automaton who is part of the Initial-Y Series, a series of automaton created personally by Y himself. Using his superior sense of hearing, Naoto fixes her in three hours despite RyuZU having been broken for 206 years as nobody was able to revive her. Promising loyalty to him, the two are eventually found out by Dr. Marie Bell Breguet, a princess of a noble family and the youngest person to become a master engineer in an international separate government organization "Meister Guild", and her automaton bodyguard Vainney Halter. With the faulty Core Tower, a central tower in every Grid city that controls its gear functions, Naoto pinpoints the problem with his sense of hearing alone in ten minutes, fixing it along with other engineers of the Meister Guild and thwarting the government's attempts to purge the city and destroy lives. As the government's illegal technological experimentation is still at large, the pairs join forces to carry out justice and prevent further purges. 
A month after their encounter, all four appear in Akihabara, Tokyo, having become the world's most infamous terrorists in their quest.

Characters

Main

Naoto is a high school student and a machine otaku. He has a hearing ability better than other people, which is why he wears headphones with a noise-canceling ability. Naoto is not interested in human girls, but he is romantically attracted to RyuZU, who is an automaton.

RyuZU is an automaton that "Y" left behind. She is Unit 1 of the "Initial-Y Series" and was manufactured about 1,000 years ago, but was broken 206 years ago and has been in a non-functional state ever since. After Naoto repaired the failure inside her that nobody could fix, she treats him like her own master. Contrary to her beautiful appearance, RyuZU has an incredibly sharp mouth. Her supreme command is 

 Marie is the youngest president of Breguet company and a first-class clock technician. She is a self confident genius girl with a sharp mouth. After she and Naoto stopped the Kyoto purge, she faked her own death and decided to keeping the clockwork in the planet safe.

Vainney is Marie's bodyguard and a former soldier. He specializes in fighting with a mechanized body of latest technology. He has been with and supported Marie for a long time.

AnchoR is another automaton part of the "Initial-Y Series" that is listed as Unit 4, RyuZU's "younger sister". She was the only automaton that was manufactured as a weapon among the "Initial-Y Series", giving her the strongest combat ability.

Others

Y is a genius engineer who is said to have rebuilt the entire functions on Earth with gears. He also created a series of automatons called , but the blueprints of his creations have long been lost.

Media

Light novels
The first light novel volume was published on April 2, 2013, by Kodansha under their Kodansha Ranobe Bunko imprint. As of December 29, 2015, four volumes have been published. North American online light novel publisher J-Novel Club have licensed the light novel. Seven Seas Entertainment has licensed the light novels in North America for print.

Manga

Anime
An anime adaptation of the light novel series was announced in December 2015, which was later confirmed to be an anime television series adaptation in December 2016. The series was directed by Tsuyoshi Nagasawa and written by Kenji Sugihara, with animation by Xebec, character designs by Shuichi Shimamura and mechanical designs by Kenji Teraoka. The music was composed by Shū Kanematsu, Hanae Nakamura, Kaori Nakano and Satoshi Hōno. The opening theme titled "Clockwork Planet" is sung by fripSide, while the ending theme titled  is sung by After The Rain. It aired from April 6 to June 22, 2017, on TBS and BS-TBS Crunchyroll licensed and streamed the series, and Funimation dubbed the series and released it on home video in North America. The series ran for 12 episodes.

References

External links
  
 Official anime website 
 

2017 anime television series debuts
2013 Japanese novels
Action anime and manga
Anime and manga based on light novels
Crunchyroll anime
Fantasy anime and manga
Funimation
J-Novel Club books
Japanese fantasy novels
Kodansha books
Kodansha manga
Kodansha Ranobe Bunko
Light novels
Seven Seas Entertainment titles
Shōnen manga
Xebec (studio)